Dobie Craig (February 14, 1938 – May 22, 2018) was an American football wide receiver and halfback. He played for the Oakland Raiders from 1962 to 1963 and for the Houston Oilers in 1964.

He died on May 22, 2018, in El Campo, Texas at age 80.

References

1938 births
2018 deaths
American football wide receivers
American football halfbacks
Baylor Bears football players
Howard Payne Yellow Jackets football players
Oakland Raiders players
Houston Oilers players